Hewa Gajaman Paththinige Kins Kumara Nelson (born 29 October 1973) is a Sri Lankan politician, former provincial councillor and Member of Parliament.

Nelson was born on 29 October 1973. He is the son of former government minister H. G. P. Nelson and brother in law of General Shavendra Silva. He was a member of the North Central Provincial Council. He defected to the government in December 2014 to support United People's Freedom Alliance (UPFA) candidate Mahinda Rajapaksa in the presidential election.

Nelson contested the 2015 parliamentary election as one of the UPFA's candidates in Polonnaruwa District but failed to get elected after coming 3rd amongst the UPFA candidates. He contested the 2020 parliamentary election as a Samagi Jana Balawegaya electoral alliance candidate in Polonnaruwa District and was elected to the Parliament of Sri Lanka.

References

1973 births
Living people
Members of the 16th Parliament of Sri Lanka
Members of the North Central Provincial Council
Samagi Jana Balawegaya politicians
Sinhalese politicians
Sri Lankan Buddhists
United National Party politicians
United People's Freedom Alliance politicians